PT Matahari Putra Prima Tbk (doing business as MPPA Retail Group) is an Indonesian retail chain that sells items for daily needs. The company operate its retail chain under the bulk of brands, such as Hypermart, Foodmart, HyFresh, Primo Supermarket, Boston Health & Beauty, Foodmart Xpress (FMX), and SmartClub.

History 
MPPA Retail Group was incorporated on 11 March 1986. The first Hypermart was opened in 2004 at Wahana Tata Cemerlang Mall in Lippo Karawaci, Tangerang. On December 19, 2014, Hypermart unveiled the new logo at the opening of the new Hypermart store with the new G7 concept at Cyberpark, North Lippo Karawaci, Tangerang. This logo was rolled out on their new and renovated existing Hypermart stores with the G7 concept throughout 2015 and still going on until present.

Initial public offering 
In December 1992, Matahari Hypermart listed its shares on the Jakarta Stock Exchange and the Surabaya Stock Exchange.  These later merged and were renamed as the Indonesia Stock Exchange.

References

External links 
 

Indonesian companies established in 1986
Companies based in Tangerang
Companies listed on the Indonesia Stock Exchange
Retail companies established in 1986
Retail companies of Indonesia
1992 initial public offerings